A list of films produced in Egypt in 1953. For an A-Z list of films currently on Wikipedia, see :Category:Egyptian films.

External links
 Egyptian films of 1953 at the Internet Movie Database
 Egyptian films of 1953 elCinema.com

Lists of Egyptian films by year
1953 in Egypt
Lists of 1953 films by country or language